The municipality of Quebracho is one of the municipalities of Cerro Largo Department, Uruguay, established on 30 October 2018. Its seat is the settlement of Quebracho.

History 
The proposal of creation of this territorial entity, along with other 5 municipalities, was made by then intendant of Cerro Largo, Sergio Botana, supported by members of his political party in the department, and was submitted to the departmental legislature to be discussed. This municipality was established on 30 October 2018 by Departmental Board of Cerro Largo's Decree No. 29/2018, which designed its territorial jurisdiction as the same territory covered by the electoral constituency series GGB of Cerro Largo Department, as defined by the Electoral Board of Cerro Largo.

Location 
The municipality is located at the mid-western region of Cerro Largo Department, bordering on one side with Tres Islas municipality and to the other side with Tupambaé municipality.

Authorities 
The authority of the municipality is the Municipal Council, integrated by the Mayor (who presides it) and four Councilors.

References 

Quebracho
2018 establishments in Uruguay
States and territories established in 2018